Stethorus is a genus of spider mite destroyers in the beetle family Coccinellidae. There are more than 40 described species in Stethorus.

Species
These 49 species belong to the genus Stethorus:

 Stethorus aptus Kapur, 1948
 Stethorus atomus Casey
 Stethorus balearicus Fursch, 1987
 Stethorus bifidus Kapur, 1948
 Stethorus brasilensis Gordon & Chapin, 1983
 Stethorus brevis Casey
 Stethorus caribus Gordon & Chapin, 1983
 Stethorus caseyi Gordon & Chapin, 1983
 Stethorus chengi Sasaji, 1968
 Stethorus comoriensis Chazeau, 1971
 Stethorus emarginatus Miyatake, 1966
 Stethorus fijiensis Kapur, 1948
 Stethorus fractus Gordon & Chapin, 1983
 Stethorus gilvifrons (Mulsant, 1850)
 Stethorus griseus , 1979
 Stethorus grossepunctatus Gordon & Chapin, 1983
 Stethorus gutierrezi Chazeau, 1979
 Stethorus hirashimai Sasaji, 1967
 Stethorus japonicus H.Kamiya, 1959
 Stethorus jejunus Casey
 Stethorus klapperichi Yu, 1995
 Stethorus loi Sasaji, 1968
 Stethorus mayaroi Gordon & Chapin, 1983
 Stethorus micellus Gordon & Chapin, 1983
 Stethorus minutalus Gordon & Chapin, 1983
 Stethorus muriculatus Yu, 1995
 Stethorus murilloi Gordon
 Stethorus nigripes Kapur, 1948
 Stethorus parcepunctatus Kapur, 1948
 Stethorus pinachi Gordon & Chapin, 1983
 Stethorus proximus Chazeau, 1979
 Stethorus pseudocaribus Gordon & Chapin, 1983
 Stethorus punctillum (Weise, 1891) (lesser mite destroyer)
 Stethorus punctum (LeConte, 1852) (spider mite destroyer)
 Stethorus pusillus (Herbst, 1797)
 Stethorus rani Kapur, 1948
 Stethorus salutaris Kapur, 1948
 Stethorus simillimus Gordon & Chapin, 1983
 Stethorus siphonulus Kapur, 1948
 Stethorus sylvestris Chazeau, 1995
 Stethorus tenerifensis Fürsch, 1987
 Stethorus tetranychi Kapur, 1948
 Stethorus tridens Gordon
 Stethorus truncatus Kapur, 1948
 Stethorus utilis (Horn, 1895)
 Stethorus vagans (Blackburn, 1892)
 Stethorus vinsoni Kapur, 1948
 Stethorus wollastoni Kapur, 1948
 Stethorus yezoensis Miyatake, 1966

References

Further reading

External links

 

Coccinellidae
Coccinellidae genera
Taxa named by Julius Weise
Articles created by Qbugbot